Edgcott is a village and a civil parish in Buckinghamshire district in the ceremonial county of Buckinghamshire, England. It is in the Aylesbury Vale, about eight miles east of Bicester.

The village name is derived from the Old English for "oak cottage".  In the Domesday Book of 1086 it is recorded as Achecote, "æcen" (from which the word "acorn" is derived) being the Old English word for oak.

The manor of Edgcott was once owned by the physician and poet Sir Samuel Garth.

The village also has HM Prison Grendon located nearby.

In 1807 Edgcott was described as:The property is divided among a few. The living is a rectory in the diocese of Oxford. The church is old but good. There is an Independent chapel.

Population 
The parish had a population of 256 people according to the 2011 censusEdgcott's population during the 1830s had a very small pool of job occupations, with the only noticeable job being an agricultural labourer. Obviously there are employers at this time who own the land and need manpower to work it, and according to the 'A Vision of Britain through Time', there were 4.☃☃ This model of industry present in Edgcott is predictable, due to the poor transport modes in that time. People couldn't travel very far to work so needed to work locally, therefore everyone who lived in Edgcott would most likely be working the land there.
The following graph shows the number of people in their different age brackets who reside in Edgcott. The data used is from 2001 and shows a top heavy population, with the majority of the population being aged between 30 and 59. 141 people are in this bracket, which is approximately 55% of the population.

St. Michael's Church 
The Church dates back to the 12th century, with many rebuilding and restorations occurring through the years. Main restorations took place in 1604 and 1875. The building was added to gradually; in the 12th century the nave and chancel were built, and then in the 15th century the west steeple was constructed. The vestry was added in the 1875 restorations.

St. Michael's is a listed building under the Planning Act of 1990 due to its architectural and historic features.

Parish Council 
There is an active parish council in Edgcott, meeting every six weeks in the evening. Meetings are held in the village hall, with the current chairman being Peter Harper. They contribute to decisions ranging from planning permission to extend a property, to fundraising for the local community.

They recently approved and carried out street light repairs in 2015 to 2016 which cost over £400, illustrating their active role in the village.

HM Prison Grendon 
This institution was opened in 1962 but was originally an experimental psychiatric prison, which dealt with prisoners with antisocial personality disorders.

It changed to operate as a normal prison since opening, with it being able to accommodate 238 inmates in Category B security conditions, however it still offers therapeutic care to offenders.  Inmates must be over 21 years of age to be eligible of residence in the prison, as well as other requirements such as committing to be drug-free and work to change their ways. The governor as of 2016 is Jamie Bennett.

References

External links

Villages in Buckinghamshire
Civil parishes in Buckinghamshire